Karl-Heinz Oberfranz (born 23 December 1951) is a German former cyclist. He competed in the individual road race for East Germany at the 1972 Summer Olympics.

References

External links
 

1951 births
Living people
People from Bad Doberan
East German male cyclists
Cyclists from Mecklenburg-Western Pomerania
Olympic cyclists of East Germany
Cyclists at the 1972 Summer Olympics
People from Bezirk Rostock